This is a list of the Spanish Singles number-ones of 1959.

Chart history

See also
1959 in music
List of number-one hits (Spain)

References

1959
Spain Singles
Number-one singles
1950s in Spanish music